Rae Naylor (born November 7, 1953) is a Canadian animator, artist, designer, director, and producer for television. She is best known for co-creating DreamWorks' The Mighty Ones, co-founding the animation studio Spümcø with John Kricfalusi, Bob Camp, and Jim Smith, and co-developing The Ren & Stimpy Show for Nickelodeon. She also worked on Batman: The Animated Series, The Powerpuff Girls, Samurai Jack, Super Robot Monkey Team Hyperforce Go!, Hi Hi Puffy AmiYumi, My Life as a Teenage Robot, and Wander Over Yonder.

Career

Naylor attended Sheridan College. She co-founded Spümcø and was involved in the development of Ren & Stimpy. Ren & Stimpy was criticized for violence with adult, bathroom, dark and sexual humor that TV scarcely uses; it was also praised by some critics and audiences and inspired more innovative satirical cartoons such as Beavis and Butt-Head, Rocko's Modern Life, South Park, Family Guy, and SpongeBob SquarePants. She also produced and directed the film Hercules and Xena - The Animated Movie: The Battle for Mount Olympus. Her biggest roles in character designs were for The Powerpuff Girls, Samurai Jack, Star Wars: Clone Wars, Foster's Home for Imaginary Friends, Hi Hi Puffy AmiYumi, and more.
Naylor and Sunil Hall created the DreamWorks series The Mighty Ones, which debuted on Hulu and Peacock in 2020.

She co-created the failed Nickelodeon pilot the Modifyers with her late husband Chris Reccardi in 2007.

Filmography

Film

Television

References

External links

http://www.tv.com/people/lynne-naylor/

20th-century births
Living people
Artists from Vancouver
Canadian art directors
Canadian production designers
Canadian storyboard artists
Canadian television directors
Canadian television producers
Canadian animated film directors
Canadian animated film producers
Canadian women television producers
Canadian women artists
Canadian women film directors
Canadian women animators
Prop designers
Spümcø
Women graphic designers
Women production designers
Canadian women television directors
Cartoon Network Studios people
Sheridan College alumni